The Philadelphia Fire Department provides fire protection and emergency medical services (EMS) to the city of Philadelphia. The PFD's official mission is to protect public safety by quick and professional response to emergencies and through the promotion of sound emergency prevention measures. This mandate encompasses all traditional firefighting functions, including fire suppression, with 58 engine companies and 27 ladder companies as well as specialty and support units deployed throughout the city; specialized firefighting units for Philadelphia International Airport and the Port of Philadelphia; investigations conducted by the Fire Marshal's Office to determine the origins of fires and to develop preventive strategies; prevention programs to educate the public in order to increase overall fire safety; and support services such as: research and planning, management of the Fire Communications Center within the City's 911 system, and operation of the Fire Academy.

The delivery of emergency medical services now generates more than seventy percent of the department's total calls for services. Furthermore, the department's Regional Emergency Medical Services Office is responsible for regulating all public and private ambulance services within the city. Lastly, the department enforces all state and federal hazardous materials (HAZMAT) regulations within the city, and coordinates the response to such incidents. The IAFF local is 22.

The PFD is the largest fire department in the Commonwealth of Pennsylvania and also has the busiest Emergency Medical Services division in the United States with a single ambulance, Medic 2, responding to 8,788 calls in 2013 and Medic 8 responded to 9,011 calls in 2018.

History

Formation of the Philadelphia Fire Department
One of the oldest established fire departments in the United States, the PFD traces its origins back to early volunteer companies, specifically the Union Fire Company, established on December 7, 1736.

Ordinances of 1840, 1855, and 1856 established a City Fire Department which was a voluntary association of independent fire companies which, in return for subsidies, accepted the direction of City Councils.

An ordinance of 29 December 1870, established Philadelphia's first fully paid and municipally controlled fire department, administered by seven commissioners chosen by Councils. The PFD officially entered into service on 15 March 1871. In 1887 the commissioners were abolished and the department placed under the control of the Department of Public Safety as the Bureau of Fire in compliance with the 1885 Bullitt Bill and enabling ordinance of 1886. The Fire Marshal, first appointed on 1864, was a member of the Bureau of Police until 1937 when his office was removed from it and placed directly under the Director of the Department of Public Safety. In 1950 it was transferred to the Bureau of Fire.

The City Charter of 1951 abolished the Department of Public Safety and established the present Fire Department. At that time its inspectorial duties were transferred to the Department of Licenses and Inspections. Investigation of the origin and cause of fires remains with the PFD fire marshal's office.

High-Pressure Fire System
As the 1800s came to an end, Philadelphia's regular water supply system had become unable to supply the needed water to fight fires in the increasingly larger and higher buildings of the central business district. After the Insurance Companies raised premiums and eventually refused to write new policies in the Downtown section of Philadelphia the City finally commissioned the installation of the High-Pressure Fire System in 1901. This would be the worlds first major city high-pressure water service dedicated for firefighting.  The system was designed to encompass the area of Delaware River to Broad Street and Race Street to Walnut Streets. The system would be supplied from a pumping station located at Race Street and Delaware Ave utilizing a total of seven 280HP natural gas powered fire pumps. The total cost of the proposed system at the time was estimated between $625,975 and $702,539. Once completed in November 1903 the system encompassed a total of 26 miles of pipe supplying 434 hydrants. The system maintained a pressure of 70psi and could be increased to over 200psi upon demand.

The system proved to be so successful that in approximately 1909 the city expanded the system to cover the Textile Mill District which was located in the North Philadelphia, Port Richmond, and Kensington neighborhoods. This expansion also included a reservoir located at 6th & Leigh Avenue fed by a large service main under Broad Street. Additional expansions were made to the original system to cover the area from the Schuylkill and Delaware Rivers from Girard Avenue to South Street. The expansions grew the original 26 miles network of pipes to 56 and also included more pumping stations. The High-Pressure Fire System was officially decommissioned in 2005 after falling into years of disrepair.

Fire Commissioners of Philadelphia 
Adam Thiel is the present Fire Commissioner of Philadelphia City. He is an Eisenhower Fellow and Aspen Innovation Voices Fellow as well. 

Lloyd Ayers, Ex Commissioner.

USAR Task Force 1 

The Philadelphia Fire Department is the sponsoring agency for Urban Search and Rescue Pennsylvania Task Force 1 (PA-TF1), one of twenty-eight FEMA Urban Search and Rescue Task Forces in the nation and the only one in Pennsylvania.

Operations

Fire station locations and apparatus

Below is a complete listing of all fire station and equipment locations in the city of Philadelphia along with their Division and Battalion. There are three divisions and 13 battalions in the department. Division 1 consists of 5 battalions and 23 fire stations while Division 2 has 4 battalions and 17 fire stations and Division 3 has 4 battalions and 21 fire stations. In November 2019, the Department announced plans to staff and reinstate four previously disbanded Engine Companies. Engine 1 in Center City, Engine 8 in Olde City, Engine 14 in Frankford and Engine 39 in Roxborough were restored on 23 November 2019. There are over 55 medic units spread across the department, including both advanced life support (ALS) and  basic life support (BLS) units. For special events, or to meet staffing requirements, the advanced life support (ALS) medic units may be downgraded to basic life support (BLS) units.  A BLS unit will contain a 'B' in their call sign, for example Medic 9B.

Division 1

Division 2

Division 3

Marine Division

Disbanded, never organized or restored fire companies

 * Engine 1 - 711 S. Broad St.  Restored 23 November 2019
 * Engine 4 - 1528 Sansom St.
 * Engine 6 - 2601 Belgrade St.
 * Engine 8 - 101 N. 4th St.    Restored 23 November 2019
 * Engine 14 - 1652 Foulkrod St. Restored 23 November 2019
 * Engine 15 - 1625 N. Howard St. - Disbanded to form Marine Unit 15
 * Engine 17 - 1328 Race St.
 * Engine 21 - 609 N. 2nd St.
 * Engine 23 - 2736 N. 6th St. - Disbanded to form Marine Unit 23
 * Engine 26 - 1010 Buttonwood St.
 * Engine 30 - 3548 Germantown Ave.
 * Engine 31 - 2736 6th St.
 * Engine 32 - 239 S. 6th St. - Disbanded to form Marine Unit 32
 * Engine 39 - 6630 Ridge Ave.  Restored 23 November 2019
 * Engine 42 - 3320 N. Front St.
 * Engine 48 - 930 S. 7th St.
 * Engine 65 - 5331 Haverford Ave.
 * Engine 67 - Haverford Ave. & N. Preston St.
 * Engine 74 - Never Organized
 * Engine 75 - Never Organized
 * Engine 76 - Philadelphia Northeast Airport
 * Engine 77 - Philadelphia International Airport - Merged with Engine 78
 * Ladder 1 - 1541 Parrish St.
 * Ladder 7 - 400 W. Girard Ave.
 * Ladder 11 - 1357 S. 12th St.
 * Ladder 17 - 1210 Oak Lane Ave.
 * Ladder 26 - 8201 Tinicum Blvd.
 * Ladder 32 - 3023 Grays Ferry Ave.
 * Ladder 33 - Never Organized

Gallery

See also

 Philadelphia Police Department
 City of Philadelphia
 List of Pennsylvania fire departments

References

External links
 Official Site 
 Philadelphia Fire Museum 
 http://www.philly.com/philly/photos/Fire_Department_Time_Capsule_Opened.html
 https://www.flickr.com/photos/philadelphiafiretrucks/

Government departments of Philadelphia
Fire departments in Pennsylvania
1870 establishments in Pennsylvania